Khomos or Khames or Khemes may refer to:
 Khames, Ardabil
 Khomos, Khuzestan